Pavlovka is a rural locality (a selo) and the administrative centre of Pavlovsky Selsoviet, Nurimanovsky District, Bashkortostan, Russia. The population was 4,143 as of 2010. There are 44 streets.

Geography 
Pavlovka is located 40 km north of Krasnaya Gorka (the district's administrative centre) by road. Verkhnekirovsky is the nearest rural locality.

References 

Rural localities in Nurimanovsky District